This is a list of diplomatic missions in Canada. At present, the capital city of Ottawa hosts 128 embassies/high commissions. Several other countries accredit their embassies and missions in the United States to Canada.

This listing excludes honorary consulates.

Diplomatic missions in Ottawa

Embassies/High Commissions

Other delegations or missions 
 (Delegation)
 (Interest Section)
 (General Delegation)
 (Economic & Cultural Office)

Consulates General/Consulates

Calgary 

 (Consulate)

Edmonton 
 (Consular post)

Halifax

Leamington 
 (Consulate)

Moncton

Montreal 

 (Consulate)

 (Consulate)

Quebec City

Toronto 

 (Trade Office)
 

 (Consulate)

 (Consulate)
 (Consulate)

 (Economic & Cultural Office)

Vancouver 

 (Trade Office)
 (Vice-consulate) 

 (Consulate)

 

 (Economic & Cultural Office)

Winnipeg 

 (Consulate)

Accredited Embassies and High Commissions 
Resident in Washington, D.C., United States of America

Resident in New York City, United States of America

Closed missions

See also 

 Foreign relations of Canada
 List of diplomatic missions of Canada
 List of embassies and high commissions in Ottawa
 List of Ambassadors and High Commissioners to Canada
 Visa requirements for Canadian citizens

References

Notes

Citations

Bibliography 
 

 
Diplomatic
Canada